Corriere dello Sport is an Italian national sports newspaper based in Rome, Italy. It is one of three major Italian sports daily newspapers and has the largest readership in central and southern Italy, the fourth most read throughout the country.

History and profile
Corriere dello Sport – Stadio was founded as a merger between Corriere dello Sport ("Sports Courier"), founded in 1924, and Stadio ("Stadium"), founded in 1948. The paper is published in broadsheet format. The 2008 circulation of the paper was 225,643 copies. According to third-party web analytics providers Alexa and SimilarWeb, Corriere dello Sport's website is rated as the 91st and 166th most visited website in Italy respectively, as of July 2015. SimilarWeb rates the site as the fourth most visited sports website in Italy, attracting almost 4.7 million visitors per month.

Editors 
1942 – Alberto Masprone
1943 – Umberto Guadagno
1944 – Pietro Petroselli
1947 – Bruno Roghi
1960 – Antonio Ghirelli
1961 – Luciano Oppo
1972 – Mario Gismondi
1976 – Giorgio Tosatti
1986 – Domenico Morace
1991 – Italo Cucci
1995 – Mario Sconcerti
2000 – Italo Cucci
2002 – Xavier Jacobelli
2003 – Alessandro Vocalelli
2012 – Paolo De Paola
2018 – Ivan Zazzaroni

See also
 Media of Italy

References

External links 
  

Newspapers published in Rome
Italian-language newspapers
Sports newspapers
Sports mass media in Italy
Sport in Rome
Daily newspapers published in Italy